On 29 January 2010, the IUCN Red List of Threatened Species identified 2657 near threatened species, subspecies, stocks and sub-populations in the Animalia kingdom.

Annelida

Hirudinoidea

Arhynchobdellae

Hirudinidae

Oligochaeta

Haplotaxida

Lutodrilidae

Arthropoda

Arachnida

Araneae

Clubionidae

Nephilidae

Oonopidae

Salticidae

Theraphosidae

Theridiidae

Branchiopoda

Anostraca

Chirocephalidae

Diplopoda

Sphaerotheriida

Arthrosphaeridae

Spirobolida

Pachybolidae

Spirobolellidae

Entognatha

Collembola

Neanuridae

Paronellidae

Insecta

Coleoptera

Anobiidae

Anthribidae

Bostrichidae

Carabidae

Cerambycidae

Cetoniidae

Cucujidae

Elateridae

Eucnemidae

Geotrupidae

Hydraenidae

Leiodidae

Lucanidae

Mycetophagidae

Oedemeridae

Scarabaeidae

Staphylinidae

Tenebrionidae

Trogositidae

Zopheridae

Grylloblattodea

Grylloblattidae

Hemiptera

Cicadellidae

Cicadidae

Cixiidae

Delphacidae

Hymenoptera

Apidae

Colletidae

Formicidae

Halictidae

Sphecidae

Lepidoptera

Argyresthiidae

Crambidae

Hesperiidae

Lycaenidae

Noctuidae

Nymphalidae

Papilionidae

Pieridae

Pyralidae

Odonata

Aeshnidae

Argiolestidae

Austropetaliidae

Calopterygidae

Chlorocyphidae

Chlorogomphidae

Coenagrionidae

Cordulegastridae

Corduliidae

Epiophlebiidae

Gomphidae

Heteragrionidae

Isostictidae

Lestidae

Lestoideidae

Libellulidae

Macromiidae

Megapodagrionidae

Not Assigned

Petaluridae

Philogeniidae

Philosinidae

Platycnemididae

Platystictidae

Polythoridae

Synlestidae

Synthemistidae

Orthoptera

Acrididae

Gryllidae

Pamphagidae

Pneumoridae

Rhaphidophoridae

Tetrigidae

Tettigoniidae

Phasmatodea

Diapheromeridae

Phasmatidae

Phylliidae

Trichoptera

Limnephilidae

Malacostraca

Decapoda

Atyidae

Cambaridae

Gecarcinucidae

Palaemonidae

Palinuridae

Parastacidae

Potamidae

Potamonautidae

Pseudothelphusidae

Chordata

Actinopterygii

Acipenseriformes

Acipenseridae

Atheriniformes

Atherinidae

Atherinopsidae

Bedotiidae

Melanotaeniidae

Beloniformes

Hemiramphidae

Characiformes

Curimatidae

Cypriniformes

Balitoridae

Catostomidae

Cobitidae

Cyprinidae

Cyprinodontiformes

Cyprinodontidae

Nothobranchiidae

Poeciliidae

Profundulidae

Esociformes

Umbridae

Osteoglossiformes

Notopteridae

Osteoglossidae

Perciformes

Centrarchidae

Cichlidae

Elassomatidae

Eleotridae

Gobiidae

Labridae

Osphronemidae

Percidae

Serranidae

Terapontidae

Salmoniformes

Galaxiidae

Lepidogalaxiidae

Retropinnidae

Salmonidae

Siluriformes

Clariidae

Ictaluridae

Mochokidae

Sisoridae

Trichomycteridae

Synbranchiformes

Chaudhuriidae

Synbranchidae

Syngnathiformes

Syngnathidae

Amphibia

Anura

Alytidae

Amphignathodontidae

Aromobatidae

Arthroleptidae

Brachycephalidae

Bufonidae

Centrolenidae

Ceratobatrachidae

Ceratophryidae

Craugastoridae

Cryptobatrachidae

Cycloramphidae

Dendrobatidae

Dicroglossidae

Eleutherodactylidae

Hemiphractidae

Hylidae

Hylodidae

Hyperoliidae

Leiuperidae

Leptodactylidae

Mantellidae

Megophryidae

Micrixalidae

Microhylidae

Myobatrachidae

Pelobatidae

Pelodytidae

Petropedetidae

Phrynobatrachidae

Pipidae

Ptychadenidae

Pyxicephalidae

Ranidae

Rhacophoridae

Scaphiopodidae

Strabomantidae

Caudata

Ambystomatidae

Amphiumidae

Cryptobranchidae

Hynobiidae

Plethodontidae

Proteidae

Rhyacotritonidae

Salamandridae

Aves

Anseriformes

Anatidae

Anhimidae

Apodiformes

Apodidae

Trochilidae

Caprimulgiformes

Caprimulgidae

Podargidae

Charadriiformes

Alcidae

Burhinidae

Charadriidae

Chionidae

Glareolidae

Haematopodidae

Laridae

Scolopacidae

Ciconiiformes

Ardeidae

Ciconiidae

Threskiornithidae

Columbiformes

Columbidae

Coraciiformes

Alcedinidae

Brachypteraciidae

Bucerotidae

Coraciidae

Cuculiformes

Cuculidae

Musophagidae

Falconiformes

Accipitridae

Cathartidae

Falconidae

Galliformes

Cracidae

Megapodiidae

Odontophoridae

Phasianidae

Gruiformes

Gruidae

Otididae

Rallidae

Turnicidae

Passeriformes

Acanthizidae

Aegithinidae

Alaudidae

Bombycillidae

Callaeatidae

Campephagidae

Cardinalidae

Certhiidae

Chloropseidae

Cisticolidae

Cnemophilidae

Colluricinclidae

Corvidae

Cotingidae

Dendrocolaptidae

Dicaeidae

Dicruridae

Emberizidae

Estrildidae

Eupetidae

Eurylaimidae

Formicariidae

Fringillidae

Furnariidae

Icteridae

Laniidae

Malaconotidae

Maluridae

Meliphagidae

Menuridae

Mimidae

Monarchidae

Motacillidae

Muscicapidae

Nectariniidae

Oriolidae

Pachycephalidae

Paradisaeidae

Paridae

Parulidae

Petroicidae

Philepittidae

Pipridae

Pittidae

Pityriaseidae

Platysteiridae

Ploceidae

Polioptilidae

Prunellidae

Ptilonorhynchidae

Pycnonotidae

Rhinocryptidae

Rhipiduridae

Sittidae

Sturnidae

Sylviidae

Thamnophilidae

Thraupidae

Timaliidae

Troglodytidae

Turdidae

Tyrannidae

Vangidae

Vireonidae

Zosteropidae

Pelecaniformes

Anhingidae

Pelecanidae

Phalacrocoracidae

Phoenicopteriformes

Phoenicopteridae

Piciformes

Bucconidae

Indicatoridae

Picidae

Ramphastidae

Procellariiformes

Diomedeidae

Hydrobatidae

Procellariidae

Psittaciformes

Psittacidae

Sphenisciformes

Spheniscidae

Strigiformes

Strigidae

Struthioniformes

Apterygidae

Casuariidae

Rheidae

Tinamiformes

Tinamidae

Trogoniformes

Trogonidae

Cephalaspidomorphi

Petromyzontiformes

Petromyzontidae

Chondrichthyes

Carcharhiniformes

Carcharhinidae

Hemigaleidae

Leptochariidae

Scyliorhinidae

Sphyrnidae

Triakidae

Chimaeriformes

Chimaeridae

Hexanchiformes

Chlamydoselachidae

Hexanchidae

Lamniformes

Lamnidae

Odontaspididae

Pseudocarchariidae

Orectolobiformes

Ginglymostomatidae

Hemiscylliidae

Orectolobidae

Pristiophoriformes

Pristiophoridae

Rajiformes

Arhynchobatidae

Dasyatidae

Gymnuridae

Mobulidae

Myliobatidae

Narcinidae

Potamotrygonidae

Rajidae

Rhinobatidae

Rhinopteridae

Torpedinidae

Urolophidae

Urotrygonidae

Squaliformes

Centrophoridae

Dalatiidae

Echinorhinidae

Somniosidae

Squalidae

Squatiniformes

Squatinidae

Mammalia

Afrosoricida

Chrysochloridae

Tenrecidae

Carnivora

Canidae

Eupleridae

Felidae

Herpestidae

Hyaenidae

Mustelidae

Otariidae

Viverridae

Cetartiodactyla

Bovidae

Cervidae

Delphinidae

Giraffidae

Monodontidae

Suidae

Tayassuidae

Chiroptera

Emballonuridae

Hipposideridae

Molossidae

Natalidae

Nycteridae

Phyllostomidae

Pteropodidae

Rhinolophidae

Vespertilionidae

Cingulata

Dasypodidae

Dasyuromorphia

Dasyuridae

Didelphimorphia

Didelphidae

Diprotodontia

Macropodidae

Phalangeridae

Potoroidae

Pseudocheiridae

Eulipotyphla

Soricidae

Talpidae

Lagomorpha

Leporidae

Macroscelidea

Macroscelididae

Microbiotheria

Microbiotheriidae

Paucituberculata

Caenolestidae

Peramelemorphia

Peramelidae

Perissodactyla

Rhinocerotidae

Pholidota

Manidae

Pilosa

Myrmecophagidae

Primates

Aotidae

Callitrichidae

Cebidae

Cercopithecidae

Cheirogaleidae

Daubentoniidae

Galagidae

Lemuridae

Lorisidae

Pitheciidae

Tarsiidae

Rodentia

Bathyergidae

Capromyidae

Caviidae

Cricetidae

Ctenomyidae

Cuniculidae

Dasyproctidae

Dipodidae

Geomyidae

Gliridae

Heteromyidae

Muridae

Octodontidae

Sciuridae

Spalacidae

Reptilia

Squamata

Agamidae

Anguidae

Boidae

Chamaeleonidae

Colubridae

Cordylidae

Elapidae

Gekkonidae

Gerrhosauridae

Helodermatidae

Iguanidae

Lacertidae

Phrynosomatidae

Pygopodidae

Scincidae

Teiidae

Tropiduridae

Varanidae

Viperidae

Testudines

Chelidae

Emydidae

Geoemydidae

Kinosternidae

Testudinidae

Trionychidae

Cnidaria

Anthozoa

Scleractinia

Acroporidae

Agariciidae

Astrocoeniidae

Dendrophylliidae

Euphylliidae

Faviidae

Fungiidae

Merulinidae

Mussidae

Oculinidae

Pectiniidae

Pocilloporidae

Poritidae

Siderastreidae

Trachyphylliidae

Stolonifera

Tubiporidae

Hydrozoa

Milleporina

Milleporidae

Echinodermata

Echinoidea

Echinoida

Echinidae

Mollusca

Bivalvia

Unionida

Margaritiferidae

Unionidae

Venerida

Sphaeriidae

Gastropoda

Architaenioglossa

Ampullariidae

Pupinidae

Viviparidae

Cycloneritimorpha

Neritidae

Hygrophila

Planorbidae

Littorinimorpha

Bithyniidae

Hydrobiidae

Moitessieriidae

Pomatiopsidae

Neogastropoda

Buccinidae

Muricidae

Sorbeoconcha

Pleuroceridae

Thiaridae

Stylommatophora

Acavidae

Agriolimacidae

Camaenidae

Cerastidae

Charopidae

Chondrinidae

Clausiliidae

Cochlicopidae

Discidae

Helicidae

Helicodiscidae

Helminthoglyptidae

Hygromiidae

Limacidae

Orculidae

Oxychilidae

Papillodermatidae

Polygyridae

Pupillidae

Rhytididae

Streptaxidae

Subulinidae

Succineidae

Trissexodontidae

Valloniidae

Vertiginidae

Vitrinidae

Zonitidae

Nemertina

Enopla

Hoplonemertea

Prosorhochmidae

Onychophora

Onychophora

Onychophora

Peripatidae

References
 IUCN 2009. IUCN Red List of Threatened Species. Version 2009.2. <www.iucnredlist.org>. Source of the above list (Downloaded on 28 January 2010):